This is the list of films produced in the Marathi language in India. The Marathi film industry is the oldest of all Indian film industries.
Raja Harishchandra, the first silent film of India was directed by Dadasaheb Phalke with the help of all Marathi-crew.
Ayodhyecha Raja was the first talkie Marathi film that released in 1932.

1910 to 1919 
 List of Marathi films of 1910-1919

1920 to 1929 
 List of Marathi films of 1920
 List of Marathi films of 1921
 List of Marathi films of 1922
 List of Marathi films of 1923
 List of Marathi films of 1924
 List of Marathi films of 1925
 List of Marathi films of 1926
 List of Marathi films of 1927
 List of Marathi films of 1928
 List of Marathi films of 1929

1930 to 1939 

 List of Marathi films of 1930
 List of Marathi films of 1931
 List of Marathi films of 1932
 List of Marathi films of 1933
 List of Marathi films of 1934
 List of Marathi films of 1935
 List of Marathi films of 1936
 List of Marathi films of 1937
 List of Marathi films of 1938
 List of Marathi films of 1939

1940 to 1949 

 List of Marathi films of 1940
 List of Marathi films of 1941
 List of Marathi films of 1942
 List of Marathi films of 1943
 List of Marathi films of 1944
 List of Marathi films of 1945
 List of Marathi films of 1946
 List of Marathi films of 1947
 List of Marathi films of 1948
 List of Marathi films of 1949

1950 to 1959 
 List of Marathi films of 1950
 List of Marathi films of 1951
 List of Marathi films of 1952
 List of Marathi films of 1953
 List of Marathi films of 1954
 List of Marathi films of 1955
 List of Marathi films of 1956
 List of Marathi films of 1957
 List of Marathi films of 1958
 List of Marathi films of 1959

1960 to 1969 
 List of Marathi films of 1960
 List of Marathi films of 1961
 List of Marathi films of 1962
 List of Marathi films of 1963
 List of Marathi films of 1964
 List of Marathi films of 1965
 List of Marathi films of 1966
 List of Marathi films of 1967
 List of Marathi films of 1968
 List of Marathi films of 1969

1970 to 1979 

 List of Marathi films of 1970
 List of Marathi films of 1971
 List of Marathi films of 1972
 List of Marathi films of 1973
 List of Marathi films of 1974
 List of Marathi films of 1975
 List of Marathi films of 1976
 List of Marathi films of 1977
 List of Marathi films of 1978
 List of Marathi films of 1979

1980 to 1989 

 List of Marathi films of 1980
 List of Marathi films of 1981
 List of Marathi films of 1982
 List of Marathi films of 1983
 List of Marathi films of 1984
 List of Marathi films of 1985
 List of Marathi films of 1986
 List of Marathi films of 1987
 List of Marathi films of 1988
 List of Marathi films of 1989

1990 to 1999 

 List of Marathi films of 1990
 List of Marathi films of 1991
 List of Marathi films of 1992
 List of Marathi films of 1993
 List of Marathi films of 1994
 List of Marathi films of 1995
 List of Marathi films of 1996
 List of Marathi films of 1997
 List of Marathi films of 1998
 List of Marathi films of 1999

2000 to 2009 

 List of Marathi films of 2000
 List of Marathi films of 2001
 List of Marathi films of 2002
 List of Marathi films of 2003
 List of Marathi films of 2004
 List of Marathi films of 2005
 List of Marathi films of 2006
 List of Marathi films of 2007
 List of Marathi films of 2008
 List of Marathi films of 2009
 List of Marathi films of 2010

2010 to 2020 

 List of Marathi films of 2010
 List of Marathi films of 2011
 List of Marathi films of 2012
 List of Marathi films of 2013
 List of Marathi films of 2014
 List of Marathi films of 2015
 List of Marathi films of 2016
 List of Marathi films of 2017
 List of Marathi films of 2018
 List of Marathi films of 2019
 List of Marathi films of 2020

2021 to present
 List of Marathi films of 2021
 List of Marathi films of 2022
 List of Marathi films of 2023

References

Culture of Maharashtra
Lists of Indian films
Lists of films by language